The 5th Asian Film Awards was given in a ceremony on 21 March 2011 as part of the Hong Kong International Film Festival.

Nominees and Winners

Best Film
Winner: Uncle Boonmee Who Can Recall His Past Lives (Thailand)
Aftershock (China)
Confessions (Japan)
Let the Bullets Fly (China/Hong Kong)
Peepli Live (India)
Poetry (South Korea)

Best Director
Winner: Lee Chang-dong, Poetry (South Korea)
Feng Xiaogang, Aftershock (China)
Jiang Wen, Let the Bullets Fly (China/Hong Kong)
Takashi Miike, 13 Assassins (Japan)
Na Hong-jin, The Yellow Sea (South Korea)
Tetsuya Nakashima, Confessions (Japan)

Best Actor
Winner: Ha Jung-woo, The Yellow Sea (South Korea)
Chow Yun-fat, Let the Bullets Fly (China/Hong Kong)
Ge You, Sacrifice (China/Hong Kong)
Ethan Juan, Monga (Taiwan)
Kōji Yakusho, 13 Assassins (Japan)

Best Actress
Winner: Xu Fan, Aftershock (China)
Jeon Do-yeon, The Housemaid (South Korea)
Rinko Kikuchi, Norwegian Wood (Japan)
Takako Matsu, Confessions (Japan)
Michelle Yeoh, Reign of Assassins (Malaysia/China/Hong Kong/Thailand)

Best Newcomer
Winner: Mark Chao, Monga (Taiwan)
Aarif Lee, Echoes of the Rainbow (Hong Kong)
Omkar Das Manikpuri, Peepli Live (India)
T.O.P, 71: Into the Fire (South Korea)
Zhou Dongyu, Under the Hawthorn Tree  (China)

Best Supporting Actor
Winner: Sammo Hung, Ip Man 2 (Hong Kong)
Huang Xiaoming, Sacrifice (China/Hong Kong)
Masaki Okada, Confessions (Japan)
Ryoo Seung-bum, The Unjust (South Korea)
Yoo Hae-jin, Moss (South Korea)

Best Supporting Actress
Winner: Youn Yuh-jung, The Housemaid (South Korea)
Yū Aoi, Ototo (Japan)
Yoshino Kimura,  Confessions (Japan)
Carina Lau, Let the Bullets Fly (China/Hong Kong)
Shanty Paredes, Madame X (Indonesia)

Best Screenwriter
Winner: Lee Chang-dong, Poetry (South Korea)
Jiang Wen and Jiang Wen, Let the Bullets Fly (China/Hong Kong)
Pang Ho-cheung and Heiward Mak, Love in a Puff (film) (Hong Kong)
Su Chao-Pin, Reign of Assassins (China/Hong Kong/Thailand)
Park Hoon-Jung, The Unjust (South Korea)

Best Cinematographer
Winner: Mark Lee Ping Bin, Norwegian Wood) (Japan)
Lee Mo-gae, I Saw the Devil (South Korea)
Hassan Kydyraliyev, The Light Thief (Kyrgyzstan)
Kenny Tse Chung-to, The Stool Pigeon (Hong Kong)
Jake Pollock, Monga (Taiwan)

Best Production Designer
Winner: Hayashida Yuji, 13 Assassins (Japan)
James Sung-pong, Detective Dee and the Mystery of the Phantom Flame (China/Hong Kong)
Eros Eflin, Madame X (Indonesia)
Huang Mei-Ching and Chen Po-Jen, Monga (Taiwan)
Lee Hwo-kyoung, The Yellow Sea (South Korea)

Best Composer
Winner: Indian Ocean, Peepli Live (India)
Saito Kazuyoshi, Golden Slumbers (Japan)
Sandee Chan, Monga (Taiwan)
Peter Kam Pui-tat and Anthony Chue, Reign of Assassins (China/Hong Kong/Taiwan)
Jang Young-gyu and Lee Byung-hoon, The Yellow Sea (South Korea)

Best Editor
Winner: Nam Na-young, I Saw the Devil (South Korea)
Kenji Yamashita, 13 Assassins (Japan)
Koike Yoshiyuki, Confessions (Japan)
Hemanti Sarkar, Peepli Live (India)
Meng Peicong, Under the Hawthorn Tree (film) (China)

Best Visual Effects
Winner: Phil Jones and Jiang Yan-ming, Aftershock (China)
Kim Tae-hun and Ryu Hee-jung, 71: Into the Fire (South Korea)
Phil Jones, Detective Dee and the Mystery of the Phantom Flame (China/Hong Kong)
Yamazaki Takashi, Space Battleship Yamato (Japan)
Park Jung-ryul, The Man from Nowhere (South Korea)

Best Costume Designer
Winner: William Chang Suk Ping, Let the Bullets Fly (China/Hong Kong)
Sawataishi Kazuhiro, 13 Assassins (Japan)
Bruce Yu Ka-on, Detective Dee and the Mystery of the Phantom Flame (China/Hong Kong)
Yen-Khe Luguern, Norwegian Wood (Japan)
Choi Se-yeon, The Housemaid (South Korea)

Special Awards
Lifetime Achievement Award: Raymond Chow (Hong Kong)
Asian Film Award for Outstanding Contribution to Asian Cinema: Kim Dong-ho (South Korea)
The Asian Film Awards for 2010’s Top Grossing Asian Film: Feng Xiaogang, Aftershock (China)
Award for the Promotion of Asian CinemaBack: Fortissimo Films

People's Choice Awards
Favorite Actor: Chow Yun-fat, Let the Bullets Fly (China/Hong Kong)
Favorite Actress: Jeon Do-yeon, The Housemaid (South Korea)

References

External links

2011 Asian Film Awards

Asian Film Awards ceremonies
2010 film awards
2010 in Hong Kong
Film
Hong Kong